Road 26 is a road in north-western Iran connecting Mianeh to Miandoab, Mahabad and Piranshahr Border with Iraqi Kurdistan.

References

External links 

 Iran road map on Young Journalists Club

26
Transportation in East Azerbaijan Province
Transportation in West Azerbaijan Province